The Northwest Central Conference is an OHSAA athletic league located in parts of northwest and western Ohio.  The league came into existence in the 2001–2002 school year.  The NWCC supports 10 league sports: Boys and Girls Cross Country, Boys Golf, Football, Volleyball, Boys and Girls Basketball, Baseball and Softball.

The NWCC brings a rich athletic history and fierce competition. Every year the NWCC produces many college-level athletes from all divisions levels of NCAA to NAIA.

Current members

Future members

Notes
Troy Christian was set to become a football-only member in the NWCC for 2012, but decided in July 2012 to cancel its football season due to low numbers.  They were hoping to play a full NWCC schedule by 2014, but ultimately withdrew from the league.  Troy Christian previously had competed as a football-only member in the NWCC until after the 2004 season.
An invitation to join was extended to Hardin Northern, a school that struggled to field a varsity football team for 2013 season. On February 19, 2014, Hardin Northern's school board voted 5-0 to withdraw from the Blanchard Valley Conference and apply to the NWCC for membership.  The NWCC accepted Hardin Northern as a full member for 2014-15 on March 19, 2014, with football joining in 2015-16.
On April 10, 2015, The Cross County Conference announced that they added Fort Loramie as a football-only member starting in  2017.  2016 will be their last season competing in the NWCC.
In December 2015, the NWCC announced that Elgin would become a full member of the league beginning in the 2017-18 school year.  Elgin will be coming over from the Mid-Ohio Athletic Conference Blue Division, which is losing seven of its members to a new league in the near future.
In April 2019, Riverside and Lehman Catholic announced they were leaving to join Covington, Bethel, Miami East, Milton-Union, Northridge and Troy Christian in the formation of a new conference
In October 2019, Ridgedale's school board voted 3-2 to leave the Northern 10 Athletic Conference and join the NWCC beginning with the 2021-2022 school year.
In January 2020, Crestline announced they would become a football-only member in 2021.
On November 2, 2021, North Baltimore announced they would be joining the NWCC fully for the 2023-24 school year.

Former members

Football championships

By year

References

External links
 

Ohio high school sports conferences